Freddie Joe Nunn (April 9, 1962  October 16, 2021) was an American former professional football player who was selected by the St. Louis Cardinals in the 1st round (18th overall) of the 1985 NFL Draft. He started his career as a defensive end and later moved to the linebacker position. He played for the Cardinals organization from 1985 to 1993, and for the Indianapolis Colts from 1994 to 1996. In his career, Nunn played in 157 games and recorded 67.5 sacks.

At the time of his death on October 16, 2021, Nunn's 66.5 sacks as a Cardinal stood as an official franchise record. When Cardinals linebacker Chandler Jones broke that record in a game played only three weeks after Nunn's death, Jones paid tribute to Nunn by revealing a t-shirt worn under his jersey bearing Nunn's name and portrait.

References

1962 births
2021 deaths
People from Noxubee County, Mississippi
American football defensive ends
American football defensive tackles
American football linebackers
Ole Miss Rebels football players
St. Louis Cardinals (football) players
Phoenix Cardinals players
Indianapolis Colts players
Players of American football from Mississippi